Piotrowice-Parcele  is a settlement in the administrative district of Gmina Słupca, within Słupca County, Greater Poland Voivodeship, in west-central Poland.

References

Piotrowice-Parcele